2675 Tolkien, provisional designation , is a stony Florian asteroid and extremely slow rotator from the inner regions of the asteroid belt, approximately  in diameter.  It was discovered on 14 April 1982, by British astronomer Martin Watt at Lowell's Anderson Mesa Station in Flagstaff, Arizona, and later named for J. R. R. Tolkien.

Orbit and classification
Tolkien is a member of the Flora family, one of the largest groups of stony asteroids in the main-belt.  It orbits the Sun in the inner main-belt at a distance of  once every 3 years and 3 months (1,202 days).  Its orbit has an eccentricity of 0.10 and an inclination of 3° with respect to the ecliptic.

Physical characteristics
In the SMASS classification, Tolkien is a stony S-type asteroid.

Rotation period
In February 2011, photometric observations of Tolkien were taken over the course of twenty-three nights.  The obtained light curve revealed that the body is potentially an extremely slow rotator, that has an outstandingly long rotation period of  hours, or 44 days, with a brightness amplitude of  magnitude.  In addition, the body is suspected to be in a non-principal axis rotation ("tumbling").

Diameter and albedo

Naming
This minor planet was named in honour of J. R. R. Tolkien (1892–1973), an English writer, philologist, and Merton professor of English language at the University of Oxford.  He is best known as the author of the fantasy novels The Hobbit and The Lord of the Rings.  Tolkien also had a lifelong interest in astronomy.  The official naming citation was published by the Minor Planet Center on 1 December 1982.

References

External links
 Asteroid Lightcurve Database (LCDB), query form (info )
 Dictionary of Minor Planet Names, Google books
 Asteroids and comets rotation curves, CdR – Observatoire de Genève, Raoul Behrend
 Discovery Circumstances: Numbered Minor Planets (1)-(5000) – Minor Planet Center
 
 

19820414
discoveries by Martin Watt
002675
J. R. R. Tolkien
002675
002675
Things named after Tolkien works